Watrous is a census-designated place in Mora County, New Mexico, United States. Its population was 135 as of the 2010 census. Watrous has a post office with ZIP code 87753, which opened on April 14, 1868. The community is located along Interstate 25. It was named after merchant and landowner Samuel Watrous, who moved to New Mexico from Vermont in 1835.

Demographics

Education
It is in the Las Vegas City Schools. Its high school is Robertson High School.

References

Census-designated places in New Mexico
Census-designated places in Mora County, New Mexico